India is one of the largest tea producers in the world, although over 70 per cent of its tea is consumed within India itself. A number of renowned teas, such as Assam and Darjeeling, also grow exclusively in India. The Indian tea industry has grown to own many global tea brands and has evolved into one of the most technologically equipped tea industries in the world. Tea production, certification, exportation, and all other facets of the tea trade in India are controlled by the Tea Board of India.

History

In India, the semi medicinal use of tea brew is noted in 1662 by Mendelslo: 

In 1689, Ovington records that tea was taken by the banias in Surat without sugar, or mixed with a small quantity of conserved lemons, and that tea with some spices added was used against headache, gravel and gripe. The tea leaves for such use may have come from China.

While experimenting to introduce tea in India, British colonists noticed that tea plants with thicker leaves also grew in Assam, and these, when planted in India, responded very well. The same plants had long been cultivated by the Singphos tribe of Assam, and chests of tea supplied by the tribal ruler Ningroola. The Assamese and Chinese varieties have been regarded in the past as different related species, but are now usually classified by botanists as the same species, Camellia sinensis. 

In the early 1820s, the British East India Company began large-scale production of tea in Assam, India, of a tea variety traditionally brewed by the Singpho people. In 1826, the British East India Company took over the region from the Ahom kings through the Yandaboo Treaty. In 1837, the first English tea garden was established at Chabua in Upper Assam; in 1840, the Assam Tea Company began the commercial production of tea in the region. Beginning in the 1850s, the tea industry rapidly expanded, consuming vast tracts of land for tea plantations. By the turn of the century, Assam became the leading tea-producing region in the world.

The introduction of Chinese tea plants, different from Indian tea, to India is commonly credited to Robert Fortune, who spent about two and a half years, from 1848 to 1851, in China working on behalf of the Royal Horticultural Society of London. Fortune employed many different means to steal tea plants and seedlings, which were regarded as the property of the Chinese empire. He also used Nathaniel Bagshaw Ward's portable Wardian cases to sustain the plants. Using these small greenhouses, Fortune introduced 20,000 tea plants and seedlings to the Darjeeling region of India, on steep slopes in the foothills of the Himalayas, with the acid soil liked by Camellia plants. He also brought a group of trained Chinese tea workers who would facilitate the production of tea leaves. With the exception of a few plants which survived in established Indian gardens, most of the Chinese tea plants Fortune introduced to India perished. The technology and knowledge that was brought over from China was instrumental in the later flourishing of the Indian tea industry using Chinese varieties, especially Darjeeling tea, which continues to use Chinese strains.

From the first, Indian-grown tea proved extremely popular in Britain, both for its greater strength, and as a patriotic product of the empire. Tea had been a high-status drink when first introduced, but had steadily fallen in price and increased in popularity among the working class. The Temperance movement massively promoted tea-drinking, from the early 19thC on, as an alternative to beer – water being of dubious quality, but the complete boiling necessary for tea rendering it safe. Many men in particular found China tea insipid, and the greater strength and lower price of Indian teas appealed greatly. By the last quarter of the nineteenth century, big brands such as Lyons, Liptons and Mazawattee dominated the market. Tea was the dominant drink for all classes during the Victorian era, working-class families often doing without other foods in order to afford it. This meant the potential market for Indian teas was vast. Indian tea (effectively including Ceylon tea from Sri Lanka) soon came to be the "norm", with China tea a minority taste. Until the 1970s and the rise of instant coffee, Indian tea had almost sole command of the hot drinks market. Its rivals were cocoa, coffee and savoury drinks such as Bovril and Oxo. In recent decades, Asian tea has lost much ground in the cheaper end of European markets to tea from Africa, especially Kenyan tea.

Modern tea production in India

India stands as the top producer of tea at present and stood also for a long period in the past. Indian tea companies have acquired a number of iconic foreign tea enterprises including British brands Tetley and Typhoo.
Camellia PLC, the parent company of Indian tea giant Goodricke Group, became the world's largest private tea producer in 2018 producing 103 million kgs.

As of 2013 the consumption of green tea in India was growing by over 50% a year.

The major tea-producing states in India are: Assam, West Bengal, Tamil Nadu,Tripura, Arunachal Pradesh, Karnataka, Sikkim, Nagaland, Uttarakhand, Manipur, Mizoram,  Meghalaya, .

Government and the Indian tea industry
The Indian tea industry as a mass employer has enjoyed the attention of the Indian government. When export sales went down, the government has been sympathetic to the demand of the industry and its cultivators. It has passed resolutions supporting the industry domestically and has also lobbied extensively with organizations like the WTO internationally.

The Indian administration along with the European Union and six other countries (Brazil, Chile, Japan, South Korea and Mexico) filed a complaint with the WTO against the Byrd Amendment, which was formally known as the Continued Dumping and Subsidy Offset Act of 2000 legislated by the US. The essence of this act was that non-US firms which sell below cost price in the US could be fined and the money is given to the US companies who made the complaint in the first place. The act adversely affected the commodities business of the complainant states and has since been repealed after WTO ruled the act to be illegal.

Furthermore, the Indian government took cognizance of the changed tea and coffee market and set up an Inter-Ministerial Committee (IMC) to look into their problems in late 2003. The IMC has recommended that the government share the financial burden of plantation industry on account of welfare measures envisaged for plantation workers mandated under the Plantation Labour Act 1951. Moreover, IMC has recommended to introduce means so that the agricultural income tax levied by the state governments can be slashed and the tea industry be made competitive. It has recommended that sick or bankrupt plantation estates should be provided with analogous level of relaxation for similarly placed enterprises/estates as are available to industries referred to BIFR.

A Special Tea Term Loan (STTL) for the tea sector was announced by the Indian government in 2004. It envisaged restructuring of irregular portions of the outstanding term/working capital loans in the tea sector with repayment over five to seven years and a moratorium of one year, which was to be on a case to case basis for large growers. The STTL also provides for working capital up to Rs. 2 lakhs at a rate not exceeding 9% to small growers.

In addition to these measures, the Tea Board plans to launch a new marketing initiative, which will include foray into new markets such as Iran, Pakistan, Vietnam and Egypt. It also plans to renew its efforts in traditional markets like Russia, the UK, Iraq and UAE. Noteworthy is its intent to double tea exports to Pakistan within a year.

Assam Orthodox Tea is set to receive the Geographical Indications (GI) exclusivity. A GI stamp identifies a certain product as emanating from the territory of a WTO member or region or locality in that territory, where a given quality, reputation or other characteristic of the good is essentially attributable to its geographic origin.

Darjeeling Tea also has its Geographical Indication (GI) registered in India in 2004 in India, in the European Union in 2007, and in other countries as well. The Darjeeling logo was registered in 1999 by the Tea Board of India in India.

The Cabinet Committee on Economic Affairs set up the Special Purpose Tea Fund (SPTF) under the tea Board on December 29, 2006. The aim is to fund replantation and rejuvenation (R&R) programme. In the same year, Tata Tea entered into an agreement to take over Jemca, which controls a 26 percent market share in the Czech Republic.

The CCEA gave its approval for pegging the subsidy at 25 per cent and adoption of a funding pattern of 25 per cent promoter's contribution, 25 per cent subsidy from the government and 50 per cent loan from the SPTF. Banks have also been instructed to increase the lending period to over 13 years.

Beginning in 2013, the Union Ministry of Commerce and Industry has been actively promoting the sale of tea in the country's top five export markets for that product: Egypt, Iran, Kazakhstan, Russia, and the United States.

Demand for a separate time zone
Tea gardens in Assam do not follow the Indian Standard Time (IST), which is the time observed throughout India and Sri Lanka. The local time in Assam's tea gardens, known as "Tea Garden Time" or Bagantime, is an hour ahead of the IST. The system was introduced during British days because of the early sunrise in this part of the country.

By and large, the system has subsequently been successful in increasing the productivity of tea garden workers as they save on daylight by finishing the work during daytime, and vice versa. Working time for tea labourers in the gardens is generally between 9 a.m. (IST 8 a.m.) to 5 p.m. (IST 4 p.m.) It may vary slightly from garden to garden.

Film maker Jahnu Barua has been campaigning for a separate time zone for the north-east region.

In popular culture
Sagina Mahato, a 1970 Bengali film, directed by Tapan Sinha, deals with labour rights in the tea plantations in the Northeast during the British Raj.

Paradesi (English: Vagabond) is a 2013 Indian Tamil drama film written and directed by Bala. The film is based on real-life incidents that took place before independence in the 1930s, especially in southern tea estates.

See also
Indian Tea Association
Indian tea culture
Tocklai Experimental Station
List of trade unions in Indian tea gardens

References 

Indian tea
Tea
India
Tea